Polygonum rurivagum is a species of flowering plant belonging to the family Polygonaceae.

Its native range is Europe, Africa and Temperate Asia.

References

rurivagum